This article provides a list of inbuilt and third party file copying and moving software - utilities and other software used, as part of computer file management, to explicitly move and copy files and other data on demand from one location to another on a storage device.

File copying is a fundamental operation for data storage. Most popular operating systems such as Windows, macOS and Linux as well as smartphone operating systems such as Android contain built-in file copying functions as well as command line (CLI) and graphical (GUI) interfaces to filing system copy and move functions. In some cases these can be replaced or supplemented by third-party software for different, extended, or improved functionality. This article lists inbuilt as well as external software designed for this purpose.

Related software 
For software designed to copy, clone, image or author entire storage devices such as CDs, DVDs, Blu-ray disks, hard drives and storage device partitions, back up data, copiers that work on storage devices as a logical unit, and more general file managers and other utilities related to file copying software, please see:

Functionality and demands met by file copy software 
Examples of comparable operating functionality seen across file copying programs:

 Criteria for original files and target location: typically a location and criteria for selection within that location) and destination location
 Existing target files: action to take in relation to existing files in target location (if a file already exists, does not exist, or other files exist)
 A subtlety in handling existing files is whether such files are overwritten on attempting to copy, or they are renamed (or the target temporarily named) and only removed once the replacement file has been verified.
 Verification: actions taken to ensure integrity of resulting compared to original files
 Queuing: how multiple operations, or operations on large files (or large numbers of files) should be scheduled and prioritized, and any queue management
 Operator confirmations and warnings: whether and when to request confirmation of an action
 File properties: whether to copy file attributes, timestamps, and permissions
 Filing system idiosyncrasies: for example, Windows filing systems may also track "8.3" short filenames or may be unable to correctly handle long file names
 Program flow and algorithms: multi-threading, buffering, data speed/priority, interruption/restart handling, atomicity/integrity assurance, and other algorithms that affect efficiency of operation.
 A notable function here relates to options determining whether the underlying file system will be requested to perform a move operation, a copy operation, or create or delete a new junction point (hard link), if this will meet the needs of the requested action. Moving, linking and delinking can be much faster and lower risk then copying, but are not always desirable or available. In particular they may not be available when the source and destination are on different logical devices or on devices that do not easily allow moving of existing data. In some cases a "copy and delete" operation may be unavoidable in performing a file move.
 Variants on pure copy and move: whether to create just the folders (directories) in the source, or create files as "null" (empty), rather than copy all data
 Status, error, and status reporting: error handling, and any logs or reports produced of the operation(s), while running or upon completion
 Compatible devices and filing systems: usable/unusable types of storage device and filing systems
 System administration and networking capabilities: for example, copying across networks and other network management aspects, remote use, authentication.

Generic differentiators and functions as software:
 Flexibility and configurability: options, skins, extensibility/plugins
 Operating system choice: cross platform?
 Operating system integration: whether the software is inbuilt, separate, or is separate but can replace inbuilt functions
 Interfaces: command line, GUI, API, script

Review 
Gizmo's Freeware published a basic comparison review of a range of well-known third party file copying software on Windows. FastCopy was given top place, being highest speed and also light on system resources (the author states it uses its own cache to avoid slowing other software, and the Win32 API and C runtime rather than MFC). Ultracopier was recognised as having a well-developed GUI interface. Unstoppable Copier was well regarded as a niche copier designed for best results with damaged media and files, but at a cost of speed. TeraCopy was also mentioned below these as also worth considering. More recently, Raymond CC's blog reviewed a similar range of software on Windows versions XP, 7, and 8, and also ranked FastCopy as the overall speed winner. Both reviews are over four years old.

List 
Operating system commands:
 Peripheral Interchange Program
 cp
 mv
 copy (command)
 xcopy – Windows copy utility included until Windows Vista and now deprecated in favour of Robocopy
 Robocopy – Windows xcopy replacement with more options, introduced as a standard feature in Windows Vista and Windows Server 2008

Notable third-party file transfer software include:
 FastCopy
 RichCopy
 Rclone – open source, used with cloud storage
 rsync – open source GPL copy utility for Windows and UNIX-like operating systems
 TeraCopy
 Ultracopier, which is the Supercopier evolution

See also 
 List of backup software
 List of Unix commands
 File managers
 List of data erasing software
 Versioning file system

References 

File copying software
File copying software
Unix software
Windows administration
Data synchronization